Sílvia Riva González (born 18 March 1979) is an Andorran politician and notary.

With a law degree and a degree in Andorran law, she completed part of her studies in Barcelona. On her return to Andorra, she co-founded the youth section of the Liberal Party of Andorra (PLA).

She ran for municipal elections in her hometown, but failed to win a seat as councilor by fifty-two votes. She decided to study political science. She was elected to the General Council in the constituency of Andorra la Vella in the 2011 legislative elections. At the Council, she took the head of the Committee on the Interior.

Newly elected Prime Minister Xavier Espot on 22 May 2019 appointed her as Minister of Culture and Sports in the new government.

References

1979 births
Living people
Andorran women in politics
Women government ministers of Andorra
Andorran lawyers
Democrats for Andorra politicians
People from Andorra la Vella
Members of the General Council (Andorra)